"Little Town Flirt" is a song by Del Shannon, which he released as a single in 1962 and on the album Little Town Flirt in 1963. It spent 14 weeks on the Billboard Hot 100 chart, peaking at No. 12, while reaching No. 1 on the Irish Singles Chart, No. 1 in Australia, No. 4 on the UK's Record Retailer chart, No. 7 on New Zealand's "Lever Hit Parade", and No. 9 on Canada's CHUM Hit Parade.

The song was ranked No. 88 on Billboards end of year ranking "Top Records of 1963".

Cover versions 

The British band Smokie released their version as a single in 1981. The cover spent a total of 17 weeks in the German chart, peaking at No. 30.

Altered Images also produced a version, first released as a promo single and as a music video in 1982, for the soundtrack album of the 1983 film Party Party. The A&M Records single was backed with "Yakety Yak" by Bad Manners, also from the soundtrack. The Altered Images cover has not re-appeared on any of the band's anthologies.

Electric Light Orchestra included their take on "Little Town Flirt" as a bonus track on their 2001 remastered release of their 1979 album Discovery.

Charts

Del Shannon version

Smokie version

References

External links 
 Smokie – "Little Town Flirt" (1981) at Discogs

1962 songs
1962 singles
1963 singles
Del Shannon songs
RAK Records singles
Songs written by Del Shannon
Number-one singles in Australia
Irish Singles Chart number-one singles